One Foot in Hell is a 1960 Western DeLuxe Color and CinemaScope film starring Alan Ladd, Don Murray (actor) and Dan O'Herlihy, directed by James B. Clark and co-written by Sydney Boehm and Aaron Spelling from a story by Spelling.

Synopsis
Mitch Barrett (Alan Ladd) is a former Confederate soldier emigrating to the West whose wife Ellie (Rachel Stephens) dies in childbirth in a small cattle town in Arizona because of what Mitch sees as the heartlessness of three local men – George Caldwell the hotel keeper (Henry Norell), Sam Giller the general store owner (John Alexander) and Ole Olsen the sheriff (Karl Swenson). Unhinged by Ellie's death, he plots to get his revenge by robbing the local bank of $100,000 deposited by a rich cattleman, thus ruining the town.

He accepts the job of deputy sheriff, then murders the sheriff so that he can take his place. To help him carry out the elaborately-planned robbery, he recruits four people: Dan Keats (Don Murray), an alcoholic ex-Confederate soldier who scrapes a living drawing portraits of the customers in saloons; Sir Harry Ivers 'of the Lancaster Ivers' (Dan O'Herlihy),  an upper-class-sounding English pickpocket; Julie Reynolds (Dolores Michaels), a prostitute who hopes for enough money to go East and make a respectable life for herself; and Stu Christian (Barry Coe), a ruthless gunman. During the robbery, on Mitch's instructions, Ivers and Christian kill the store owner and the hotel keeper.

Afterwards,  Mitch sets out to eliminate the other members of the gang in order to conceal his own part in the plot. He succeeds in killing Ivers and Christian but when he corners Dan and Julie, who have fallen in love, Julie manages to kill him. Dan and Julie then return the money, prepared to stand trial and spend some years in jail with the prospect of long-term happiness awaiting them after their release.

Cast
 Alan Ladd as Mitch Barrett
 Don Murray as Dan Keats
 Dan O'Herlihy as Sir Harry Ivers
 Dolores Michaels as Julie Reynolds
 Barry Coe as Stu Christian
 Larry Gates as Doc Seltzer
 Karl Swenson as Sheriff Ole Olsen
 John Alexander as Sam Giller
 Rachel Stephens as Ellie Barrett

Production
The film was known as Gunslinger or The Gunslingers.

The budget was over $1 million and Ladd got 10% of the profits.

Filming was interrupted when the Screen Actors Guild went on strike during the shoot on March 7. Filming resumed on 11 April. Alan Ladd injured his hand while working at his ranch during the layoff but was well enough to resume filming.

Dolores Michaels said that "Playing westerns aren't included among the things I'll settle for on screen, although the part of Julie in this picture is better than most. She's a bad girl who goes good and has a highly dramatic moment with a gun at the end. But a woman never wins in a Western and there's just so much you can do with this period piece."

References

External links
 
 
 
 

1960 films
1960 Western (genre) films
1960s English-language films
20th Century Fox films
CinemaScope films
American Western (genre) films
Films directed by James B. Clark
Films scored by Dominic Frontiere
Revisionist Western (genre) films
1960s American films